Rovišče pri Studencu is a nucleated settlement in the Municipality of Sevnica in central Slovenia. The area is part of the historical region of Lower Carniola. The municipality is now included in the Lower Sava Statistical Region.

Name
The name of the settlement was changed from Rovišče to Rovišče pri Studencu in 1955.

Church
The local church is dedicated to Saint Ulrich and belongs to the Parish of Studenec. It dates to the 17th century.

References

External links
Rovišče pri Studencu at Geopedia

Populated places in the Municipality of Sevnica